Camp French (44PW0917) was the site of a major Confederate Army encampment in the US state of Virginia between March 1861 and August 1862. It was located behind Fort French which was renamed Fort Lee in 1863. Archeological surveys conducted since 1994 have identified locations of winter huts, an arms magazine, and a target range. The site is partially occupied by the Medal of Honor Golf Course, and traversed by Fuller Road.

The Camp French site was listed on the National Register of Historic Places in 2008.

References

Military facilities on the National Register of Historic Places in Virginia
Buildings and structures completed in 1861
Prince William County, Virginia
1861 establishments in Virginia
Archaeological sites on the National Register of Historic Places in Virginia
National Register of Historic Places in Prince William County, Virginia